Dennis E. Clerkin (born 1950) is a professional American bridge player. Clerkin is from Bloomington, Indiana.

Bridge accomplishments

Wins

 North American Bridge Championships (6)
 North American Pairs (1) 1989 
 Grand National Teams (2) 1990, 2010 
 Senior Knockout Teams (1) 2007 
 Keohane North American Swiss Teams (1) 2010 
 Chicago Mixed Board-a-Match (1) 1992

Runners-up

 North American Bridge Championships
 Jacoby Open Swiss Teams (1) 2008 
 Keohane North American Swiss Teams (1) 1977

Notes

External links
 

Living people
American contract bridge players
1950 births
Place of birth missing (living people)
Date of birth missing (living people)
People from Bloomington, Indiana